Abdoun may refer to:

Djamel Abdoun, Algerian football player
Abdoun neighborhood, Amman, an affluent neighborhood of the Jordanian capital
Abdan, a city in Iran
Abdun, Iran, a village in Iran
Abdun-e Anjir, a village in Iran